Marie-Louise Sjoestedt-Jonval (20 September 1900 – 26 December 1940) was a French linguist and literary scholar who specialized in Celtic studies, especially Irish mythology. Together with Joseph Loth, she was co-editor of Revue Celtique and director at the École pratique des hautes études in Paris, France.

Her best-known work is Dieux et héros des Celtes (1940), which appeared in a posthumous English translation by Myles Dillon as Gods and Heroes of the Celts (1949). It deals with the gods and heroes of the continental Celts and Irish mythology.

Publications 
 1926. L'aspect verbal et les formations à affixe nasale en celtique. Paris: Librairie Honoré Champion.
 1931. Phonétique d'un parler irlandais de Kerry. Paris: Ernest Leroux.
 1936. "Légendes épiques Irlandaises et monnaies gauloises: recherches sur la constitution de la legende de Cuchullainn." Études Celtiques 1. pp. 1–77. . RHS record
 1938. Description d'un parler irlandais de Kerry. Bibliothèque de l'École des Hautes Études 270. Paris: Librairie Honoré Champion. 222 p.
 1938. "Études sur le temps et l'aspect en vieil irlandais." Études Celtiques 3. pp. 105–130 and 219-273.
 1940. Dieux et Héros des Celtes. Paris: Leroux. (Chapters: Mythes et religions : période mythique - divinités (celtes continentaux - déesses-mères d'Irlande - Dieux-chefs de l'Irlande) - Hommes et Dieux et Héros, Samain-Samonios : Fête du premier Novembre)
 1949. Gods and Heroes of the Celts, London, Methuen. English translation by Myles Dillon.

Further reading

 Dumézil, Georges. Marie-Louise Sjoestedt (1900–1940) In memoriam. Paris, 1941 Image.
Ó Lúing, Seán. "Marie-Louise Sjoestedt, Celtic scholar, (1900–1940)." Journal of the Kerry Archaeological & Historical Society 20 (1987). pp. 79–93. . RHS record

Celtic studies scholars
French philologists
Women philologists
1940 deaths
1900 births
1940 suicides
20th-century philologists
Suicides in France